Gary W. Bikman (born November 13, 1943) is a Canadian politician who was previously an elected member to the Legislative Assembly of Alberta representing the electoral district of Cardston-Taber-Warner.

Prior to his election to the legislature, Bikman served on the town council of Stirling, including stints as mayor, deputy mayor and councillor since 1980.

Bikman was born and raised in southern Alberta. He holds a Bachelor of Science degree and a Master of Business Administration degree from Brigham Young University in Provo, Utah. Bikman has extensive business experience, having successfully owned and managed an oilfield service company for 25 years. He cofounded and led ChopStix Restaurants from 2006 to 2010 and ChopStix International Franchising from 2010 to 2012.  Bikman has been a sessional instructor at the University of Lethbridge's faculty of management and at Lethbridge College. He has also served intermittently as a member of the Chinook Arch Regional Library Board and as a scout leader in the village of Stirling.

Bikman has been a critic of the Alberta government's decision to cut funding supports for persons with developmental disabilities in the 2013-2014 budget.

After the 2012 election, he faced some controversy when, in an interview with CTV News shortly after the election, he attributed his party's defeat to urban voters, who largely remained loyal to the governing Progressive Conservatives, possessing less "common sense" than the rural voters who turned to the Wildrose Party.

Bikman was first elected in the 2012 provincial election, as part of the Wildrose Party caucus. On December 17, 2014, he was one of nine Wildrose MLAs who crossed the floor to join the Progressive Conservative caucus.  Bikman failed to earn the PC nomination as a candidate of his riding for the May 5, 2015 election.

Electoral history

References

External links
Gary Bikman

Wildrose Party MLAs
Living people
People from Lethbridge
People from Stirling, Alberta
Mayors of places in Alberta
Canadian Latter Day Saints
1943 births
Progressive Conservative Association of Alberta MLAs
Brigham Young University alumni
21st-century Canadian politicians
Canadian expatriates in the United States